Tieta is a 1989 Brazilian telenovela, produced and broadcast by TV Globo. It originally aired between August 14, 1989, and March 30, 1990, spanning 196 episodes. It was TV Globo's 41st primetime telenovela, preceded by O Salvador da Pátria and followed by Rainha da Sucata.

It was based on Brazilian writer Jorge Amado's 1977 novel of the same name, and was written by Aguinaldo Silva, Ricardo Linhares and Ana Maria Moretzsohn. It was directed by Reynaldo Boury, Ricardo Waddington and Luiz Fernando Carvalho, under general direction by Paulo Ubiratan.

In June 2012 it was released on DVD by Globo Marcas.

Production
Helena Gastal and Lessa de Lacerda designed over one thousand costumes for the novel. Iris Gomes da Costa researched expressions cited in the work of Jorge Amado, and colloquial terms of the region, so that the characters spoke with the accent and used the vocabulary of northeastern Brazil.

The fictional city of Santana do Agreste was composed of 46 buildings, 2 churches, 8 streets, 2 squares, an abandoned circus and 15 ruins. Everything was built in an area of 10,000m², in Guaratiba, a West Zone neighborhood in the city of Rio de Janeiro, Brazil. The street floors were a reproduction of those made in fiberglass by local artisanin in Laranjeiras, a town in the state of Sergipe. Production artists Cristina Médicis, Marta Kubitschek and Andréa Penafiel took local objects and saints statues from Sergipe to Rio de Janeiro, in order to compose the cenography.

Cast
Betty Faria - Tieta
Joana Fomm - Perpétua Esteves Batista
Cássio Gabus Mendes - Ricardo
José Mayer - Osnar
Lídia Brondi - Leonora
Reginaldo Faria - Ascanio
Arlete Salles - Carmosina
Yoná Magalhães - Tonha
Sebastião Vasconcelos - Zé Esteves
Tássia Camargo - Elisa Esteves D'Alembert
Paulo Betti - Timóteo D'Alembert
Françoise Forton - Helena
Ary Fontoura - Coronel Arthur da Tapitanga
Marcos Paulo - Arthurzinho da Tapitanga / Mirko Stéphano
Luciana Braga - Maria Imaculada
Armando Bógus - Modesto Pires
Bete Mendes - Aída Pires
Luíza Tomé - Carol
Roberto Bonfim - Amintas
Cláudio Corrêa e Castro - 	Padre Mariano
Lília Cabral - Amorzinho
Rosane Gofman - Cinira
Miriam Pires - Dona Milu

Soundtrack
Tieta spanned two soundtrack albums, Tieta and Tieta 2, both released in 1989. During its reprise, in 1994, Som Livre released an album entitled Tieta Especial, compiling the hit songs of the two original albums. Its cover was similar to that of Tieta 2, with a photo of Betty Faria as Tieta.

References

External links

1989 telenovelas
1989 Brazilian television series debuts
1990 Brazilian television series endings
Brazilian telenovelas
Period television series
Television shows based on Brazilian novels
TV Globo telenovelas
Telenovelas directed by Luiz Fernando Carvalho
Portuguese-language telenovelas
Television series about revenge